Mordue is an English surname.

Notable people with this surname include:
 Eddie Mordue (1928-2011), British saxophonist
 Jackie Mordue (1886-1938), English footballer
 Jennifer Mordue, British entomologist
 Norman A. Mordue (1942-2022), American judge
 Shayna Mordue, former name of Shayna Rose (born 1983), American actress
 Tom Mordue (1905–1975), English footballer